Sphynx is Melechesh's third full-length album. The album presents the band's Mesopotamian/Sumerian metal in a more aggressive and intricate manner. The CD version includes an enhanced multimedia section featuring a trip to the world of Melechesh (lyrical overviews, wallpaper, photos, glossary of terms, and a videoclip for the track "Genies, Sorcerers and Mesopotamian Nights"). There is a guest appearance from Andy LaRocque on the track "Purifier of the Stars".

The Limited LP version contains a cover of Celtic Frost's "Babylon Fell".

Track listing

Production
Produced, Engineered & Mixed By Andy LaRocque
Mastered By Atti Bauw

Personnel
Ashmedi: Lead Vocal, Lead, Rhythm & Acoustic Guitars, Keyboards, Percussion
Moloch: Lead & Rhythm Guitars
Al'Hazred: Bass, Backing Vocals
Proscriptor: Drums, Percussion

Additional personnel
 Christophe Szpajdel — logo

2003 albums
Melechesh albums